This is a list of National Historic Sites in the province of British Columbia. As of January 2020, there were 100 National Historic Sites designated in British Columbia, 13 of which are administered by Parks Canada (identified below by the beaver icon ).  The first National Historic Sites to be designated in British Columbia were Fort Langley and Yuquot in 1923.

Numerous National Historic Events also occurred across B.C., and are identified at places associated with them, using the same style of federal plaque which marks National Historic Sites. Several National Historic Persons are commemorated throughout the province in the same way. The markers do not indicate which designation—a Site, Event, or Person—a subject has been given. The Rideau Canal is a Site, for example, while the Welland Canal is designated an Event. The cairn and plaque to John Macdonell does not refer to a National Historic Person, but is erected because his home, Glengarry House, is a National Historic Site. Similarly, the plaque to John Guy officially marks not a Person, but an Event—the Landing of John Guy.

This list uses names designated by the Historic Sites and Monuments Board of Canada, which may differ from other names for these sites.

National Historic Sites

Former National Historic Site in BC

See also

 History of British Columbia
 List of heritage buildings in Vancouver
 List of historic places in British Columbia

External links
National Historic Sites of Canada - Parks Canada
Historic places - Administered by Parks Canada

References

 
British Columbia